Brannon Kidder (born November 18, 1993) is an American middle-distance runner.

In 2017, he won the gold medal in the men's 4 × 800 metres relay at the 2017 IAAF World Relays held in Nassau, Bahamas.

In 2019, he represented the United States in The Match Europe v USA where he won the bronze medal in the mixed 1600 metres medley relay event and he finished in 5th place in the men's 800 metres event. In the same year, he also competed in the men's 800 metres event at the 2019 World Athletics Championships held in Doha, Qatar. He qualified to compete in the semi-finals and he did not advance to compete in the final.

References

External links

 
 
 

1993 births
Living people
Place of birth missing (living people)
American male middle-distance runners
World Athletics Championships athletes for the United States